Robert Duke Osborn (February 1, 1897 – November 2, 1976) was an American football player. After high school, Osborn attended Penn State University. Osborn made his professional debut in the National Football League in 1921 with the Canton Bulldogs. He would go to help the Bulldogs win back-to-back NFL Championships in 1922 and 1923. During the course of his career, Osborn also played for the Cleveland Bulldogs and Pottsville Maroons. He spent a total of 8 years in the NFL. Osborn also became part owner of the Maroons in 1928, when team's owner, Dr. John G. Streigel, "loaned" the team to three players Wilbur "Pete" Henry, Herb Stein and Osborn. However, after the season Streigel, who probably still had majority ownership, sold the team to a New England-based partnership that included Maroons' standout George Kenneally.

After his career in football Osborn became a general superintendent for Oldsmobile’s assembly division.

References
The Stolen Championship of the Pottsville Maroons
Ghosts of the Gridiron:Pottsville Maroons

Notes

1897 births
1976 deaths
Players of American football from Pennsylvania
Canton Bulldogs players
Cleveland Bulldogs players
Penn State Nittany Lions football players
People from Clearfield County, Pennsylvania
People from Jefferson County, Pennsylvania
Pottsville Maroons players